World Mime Organisation (Abbreviation: WMO; French: Organisation Mondiale des Mimes; Abbreviation: WMM) was officially registered on January 4, 2004 in Belgrade, Serbia (at that time still State Union of Serbia and Montenegro). WMO is a non-governmental, non-profit organization founded with the mission to further develop and promote the art of mime and non-verbal communication. World Mime Organisation does not emphasis any mime techniques or styles nor teaching, accepting that all organized effort, knowledge and expression should be respected and should find its audience.

History
The creators of the World Mime Organisation are Marko Stojanović, a Serbian actor, professor and mime artist and Ofer Blum, mime artist from Israel. Both were students of the Paris International School of Mimodrama Marcel Marceau (Ecole International de Mimodrame da Paris Marcel Marceau) in the early 1990s.

In 1998, Stojanovic organized a tour in Serbia (at that time Federal Republic of Yugoslavia) for Ofer Blum and they discussed the necessity of organizing and uniting mime artists around the world. The idea was just a note on a piece of paper till 2004 when World Mime Organisation was officially registered. Belgrade, Serbia (State Union of Serbia and Montenegro) was chosen for headquarters of WMO because the administrative work needed was the simplest and the costs were the lowest and Stojanovic was chosen to be the president of the organization and Ofer Blum the vice-president.

The association statutes of the WMO were adopted on April 18, 2011. Being an international organization since its first day of existence World Mime Organisation uses English and French as the official languages and Serbian as the legal language because it operates under the laws of the Republic of Serbia.

Objectives 
The main objectives of the World Mime Organisation are to "establish relations, help and bring together" mime artists, mime educators, producers and world-wide audience, students, amateurs, hearing impaired and other vulnerable social groups, media and institutions.

World Mime Day 
World Mime Day is an initiative of the World Mime Organisation to celebrate the Art of Mime and non-verbal communication on March 22, the day of birth of legendary French mime artist Marcel Marceau. It has been celebrated since 2011. World Mime Day is not officially recognized by UNESCO.
Since 2016 the World Mime Day Wiki Edit-a-Thon has been organized by local Wikimedia chapters and local persons or institution involved in mime together with the World Mime Organisation with the aim of enriching the knowledge, photo and multimedia content about mime on Wikipedia.

WMO Awards 
The World Mime Organisation has decided in 2015 to establish two "Special WMO Awards", one for the individuals and the other for institutions.
The "Special WMO Award for the Outstanding Contribution to the Art of Mime" that is dedicated for individuals and "Special WMO Award for Promotion and Development of the Art of Mime" is dedicated to institutions.

Special WMO Award for the Outstanding Contribution to the Art of Mime

This is an award dedicated to mime personalities, individuals that have contributed so much to their national and international community through the art of mime by practicing it and/or teaching it.
"Some of the laureates think of this award as of the Life Achievement Award but we believe that even if some of them are in their late 70's, 80's they still have horizons to reach, new heights to achieve and share their art and knowledge with the world.
This award is a simple but official way for the international mime community gathered in the World Mime Organisation to say "THANK YOU" to the laureates.

The first laureate in 2015 was Amiran Shalikashvili a Georgian mime artist and one of the founders of mime in the Georgia and Union of Soviet Socialist Republics (USSR), founder of the Georgian State Pantomime Theatre and the Department of Mime at the Shota Rustaveli Theatre and Georgia State Film University (TAFU) The same award was presented to professor Stanislaw Brosowski of the Stockholm Academy of Dramatic Arts, a Swedish mime artist of Polish origins and a founder of the Department for Mime Acting at the Stockholm Academy for Dramatic Arts.

The LAUREATES:
 2015 Amiran Shalikashvili (Georgia)
 2016 Stanislaw Brosowski (Sweden)
 2017 Boris Svidensky (Israel)
 2017 Andres Valdes (Slovenia)
 2017 Ella Jaroszewicz (France)
 2017 Yoram Boker (Israel)
 2017 Carlos Martínez (Spain)
 2017 Ivan Klemenc (Serbia)
 2017 Corinne Soum (France)
 2018 Velio Goranov (Bulgaria)

Special WMO Award for Promotion and Development of the Art of Mime

This award is dedicated to institutions that have been promoting and developing mime for decades and are still active. We see institutions as organisational and not necessarily physical structures where people come together to interact and share. Share their art, knowledge, thoughts, ideas, principles, feelings.
This award is for theatres, schools, festivals, theatre or production companies, media...Without people the institutions would not exist. With this award we want to say a simple THANK YOU to teams, all the people that have built in the past and those that are still building the Laureate Institution.

The LAUREATES:
 2015 Georgian State Pantomime Theatre (Georgia)
 2016 Yerevan State Pantomime Theatre (Armenia)
 2017 Pantomimteatern (Sweden)
 2018 Studio Magenia (France)
 2018 International Visual Theatre (France)
 2018 International Festival of Monodrama and Mime (Serbia)

References

External links 
 World Mime Organisation official web site

Mime
Theatrical organizations
Arts organizations based in Serbia
Pantomime
International organizations based in Serbia